Joint Task Force 2 (JTF 2) is an elite  special operations force of the Canadian Armed Forces, serving under the Canadian Special Operations Forces Command. JTF 2 is known to work with other special operations forces such as Delta Force, Seal Team Six, the British SAS, and the British SBS. The unit has distinguished itself as a world-class Tier 1 special operations unit.

Serving as the centrepiece of Canadian special operations, JTF 2 is primarily tasked with counter-terrorism operations, both domestic and abroad, and specializes in direct action, special reconnaissance and surveillance, hostage rescue, protective security, foreign internal defence and other high-value tasks. Much of the information regarding JTF 2 is classified, and is not commented on by the Government of Canada.

History

In 1992, Deputy Minister of Defence Robert Fowler announced he was recommending to Governor General Ray Hnatyshyn that he disband the Royal Canadian Mounted Police's Special Emergency Response Team (SERT) and create a new military counter-terrorism group. The decision was made largely because the Canadian Forces offered a greater pool of recruits for the program than civilian police forces, and it stemmed the public uproar about police being taught to use primarily lethal means.

In early 1993, the unit was activated with just over 100 members, primarily drawn from the Canadian Airborne Regiment and Princess Patricia's Canadian Light Infantry. They were given the SERT facility on Dwyer Hill Road near Ottawa as their own base of operations, and permanently parked a Greyhound bus and a DC-9 aircraft on the grounds for use in training.

Its first scheduled action was Operation Campus, the protection of highways and water treatment plants around the Oka reserve while a police force tried to "crack down on smuggling" on the native reserve, immediately following the Oka crisis. However two daily newspapers in Quebec revealed the operation just days before it was to go into action, and it was cancelled.
The federal budget of December 2001 allocated approximately $120 million over six years to expand unit capabilities and double its size to an estimated 600 personnel, as part of the overall plan following the attacks of September 11, 2001.

Battle honours
JTF 2 does not carry individual battle honours, but instead also shares the motto  ("everywhere") with The Royal Regiment of Canadian Artillery and the Corps of Royal Canadian Engineers.

Operations

Bosnia
JTF 2 forces were inserted into Bosnia, operating in two- to four-man teams hunting for Serbian snipers who were targeting UN forces at the sniper alley. They were scheduled to free approximately 55 hostages in Operation Freedom 55, but the mission was cancelled as the Bosnian Serbs released all the prisoners voluntarily.

Haiti
In 1996, JTF 2 deployed to Haiti to advise the security forces of President René Préval on methods to repel the revolutionary army, train local SWAT teams and raid weapons smugglers in Port-au-Prince.

According to the Canadian Broadcasting Corporation, JTF 2 was also in Haiti at the time that Haitian president Jean-Bertrand Aristide was ousted from power in 2004. They protected the Canadian embassy and secured the airport.

War on Terror
In the aftermath of the September 11 attacks and the American declaration of a War on Terror, approximately 40 JTF 2 soldiers were sent to southern Afghanistan in early December 2001 to be part of Task Force K-Bar, under the command of Captain Robert Harward. The Canadian public was not informed of the deployment. However, in Sean M. Maloney's book Enduring the Freedom, it was reported that JTF 2 was secretly deployed without Prime Minister Jean Chrétien's permission in early October 2001. Under Task Force K-Bar, JTF 2 worked extensively with the U.S. 3rd Special Forces Group; one of their first missions in Afghanistan was what Harward described as "the first Coalition direct action mission since the Second World War." The joint operation with a team of Green Berets targeting a Taliban command node almost ended in disaster when a Chinook carrying JTF 2 operators was forced to make a hard landing near the target site. While serving with Task Force K-Bar, Harward also stated that the JTF 2 team under his command was his first choice for any direct action.

Several months later, The Globe and Mail published an image on its front page showing operators in distinctive forest-green Canadian Forces combat uniforms delivering captured prisoners to the Americans. This prompted an outcry in Parliament as MPs were never informed these operations were underway. Vice Admiral Greg Maddison was called before the Standing Committee on Procedure and House Affairs to address claims that Minister of Defence Art Eggleton had purposely misled the public and the government, even failing to inform the Prime Minister that JTF 2 had been operating in Afghanistan. Segments of the Canadian media made much of the special forces handing over detainees, particularly those who may have been sent to Guantanamo Bay. In January 2002, JTF 2 deployed reconnaissance teams to the series of caves discovered in Zhawar Kili, just south of Tora Bora. Airstrikes hit the sites before SOF teams were inserted into the area. A platoon from SEAL Team 3, including several of their Desert Patrol Vehicles, accompanied by a German Kommando Spezialkräfte (KSK) element and a Norwegian SOF team, spent some nine days conducting extensive site exploitation, clearing an estimated 70 caves and 60 structures in the area, recovering a huge amount of both intelligence and munitions, but they did not encounter any al-Qaeda fighters. In March 2002, JTF 2 reconnaissance teams took part in Operation Anaconda; they also conducted close protection tasks and participated in numerous direct action missions, allegedly including the siege at Mirwais hospital in Kandahar, where a US Army Special Forces operational detachment-A (SFODA) killed a group of al-Qaeda terrorists hiding in a hospital ward; JTF 2 also carried out numerous operations with the New Zealand Special Air Service. JTF 2's first rotation was completed when they returned to Canada in May 2002, to be replaced by a second, shorter term, deployment until October 2002.

In 2004, an estimated 40 members of JTF 2 serving with Task Force K-Bar were awarded the Presidential Unit Citation by the U.S. government for service in Afghanistan. Very little is known on JTF 2 operations in Afghanistan, but during a conference the former Chief of Defence Staff, General Rick Hillier, stated that JTF 2 was in "high demand" and that they were considered to be "world class". He went on to say that the unit was providing direct support to the Afghan government and was targeting the Taliban leadership in southern Afghanistan. He stated that "trying to help neutralize those leaders is a key part of their role and that's what they will continue to do."

On 26 November 2005, members of the terrorist group Swords of Righteousness Brigade – a small offshoot of possibly Islamic Army in Iraq (IAI), Ansar al-Islam (AAI), Army of Islam, or a cover name for their abduction cells, or freelance cash criminal abductors – kidnapped four members (two Canadian, one British and one American) of the Christian Peacemaker Teams in Baghdad, Iraq. In response, Task Force Knight — the British special forces task force in Iraq — initiated Operation Lightwater; spearheaded by B Squadron, 22nd Special Air Service Regiment (SAS), the aim of which was to find and recover the hostages; a small team of JTF 2 and Canadian intelligence experts joined the task force for the operation whilst the United States provided technical intelligence to the operation. Together the force carried out relentless raids across the city, building up a picture by exploiting intelligence in the search for the hostages, eventually on the 23 March 2006 the three remaining hostages were rescued by the SAS. The Pentagon and the British Foreign Office both commented on the instrumental role JTF 2 played in rescuing the British and Canadian Christian Peacemaker Team that were being held hostage in Iraq. Involvement of JTF 2 was not confirmed by Canadian officials.

There has been much speculation in the Canadian media on possible JTF 2 operational deployments. As of 2001, the unit had 297 members, but by the end of the year, with the War on Terror becoming a reality, the federal government announced their intentions to increase it to 600 members within four years.

As of 2014, the unit was believed to be in Iraq as training personnel, under the Canadian Operation Impact which is part of Operation Inherent Resolve. The Canadian Government has not denied or confirmed JTF 2's involvement.

The shot was taken from a high-rise building using a standard Canadian military issued McMillan Tac-50 rifle, a .50 caliber (12.7×99mm) anti-materiel rifle commonly used by snipers in an anti-personnel role. The Canadian Forces designation is the C15 Long-Range Sniper Weapon (LRSW).

Other actions

Vice-Admiral Dean McFadden also confirmed that JTF 2 would take a role in securing the 2010 Winter Olympics and 2010 Winter Paralympics.

JTF 2 has also acted as bodyguards to Canadians travelling abroad, notably accompanying Lieutenant-General Maurice Baril and Raymond Chrétien to Zaire in November 1996. When photographs provided to the media were revealed to show the faces of JTF 2 forces, they were redacted and reissued with the faces removed. In 1998, they accompanied General Roméo Dallaire to Tanzania where he was due to testify against a Rwandan Hutu official accused of complicity in the 1994 genocide. They similarly accompanied war crimes prosecutor Louise Arbour into Kosovo. In early November 2000, Conservative Defence Critic David Price stated that JTF 2 had been deployed to Kosovo, however, this was denied by Prime Minister Jean Chrétien and Defence Minister Art Eggleton.

The unit was believed to be operating with the Special Air Service and Special Boat Service in Operation Mobile, the Canadian operation in the 2011 Libyan civil war.

In August 2021, JTF-2 and CSOR operators were deployed to Afghanistan to evacuate staff from the Canadian Embassy in Kabul.

In May 2022, Prime Minister Justin Trudeau visited Ukraine to show solidarity and to witness the war for himself, alongside members of the cabinet. As part of the security detail, they were accompanied by members of JTF 2.

Unit accountability
On 21 December 2006, a Federal Court judge rejected a request to proceed with a court martial against an unnamed JTF 2 officer, accused of assaulting and mistreating a subordinate. Because court martial requests require that the accused be named, the judge suggested that they explore other avenues to proceed with the court martial.

JTF 2 has acknowledged the death of one member. Master Corporal Anthony Klumpenhouwer, 25, died on April 18, 2007, after falling off a communications tower in Kandahar, Afghanistan. In 2010, the investigation into Klumpenhouwer's death was completed, and revealed that he had been knocked unconscious by a surge of electricity.

Equipment
Operators use a range of weapons including:
 Colt Canada series of rifles: C7, C8 and C8SFW 
 SIG Sauer SIG 716 G2 designated marksman rifle 
 Heckler & Koch MP5 (A2/A3/SD) submachine gun 
 FN Herstal P90 personal defence weapon 
 SIG Sauer P226 sidearm 
 SIG Sauer P320 sidearm. In June 2021, an enquiry completely exonerated the weapon as the cause of the accidental discharge. The pistol was reintroduced June 2022. 
Remington Model 870 and Benelli M3 shotguns
 FN Minimi C9A1 light machine gun
 M2 Browning heavy machine gun.
 Accuracy International AWP, C14 Timberwolf, Heckler & Koch PSG1, M110 Semi-Automatic Sniper System, McMillan TAC-50 and Barrett M82 sniper rifles 
 M203 grenade launcher, Heckler & Koch GMG automatic grenade launcher and Heckler & Koch HK69A1 grenade launcher. 
 Rafael Spike-LR anti-tank guided missile 
 Saab Bofors Dynamics AT4 anti-tank weapon.
 Carl Gustaf 8.4cm recoilless rifle M4 version

JTF 2 uses the High Mobility Multipurpose Wheeled Vehicle (HMMWV) special operations version. A replacement project was cancelled in 2010. In 2016, the DAGOR (Deployable Advanced Ground Off-road) vehicle by Polaris Defense was awarded the Ultra-Light Combat Vehicle (ULCV) contract to provide 78 vehicles to CANSOFCOM.

See also

References

External links

Canadian Special Operations Force Command
Military units and formations of Canada
Military units and formations established in 1993
Special forces units and formations
Special forces of Canada
Military counterterrorist organizations